The 1994 Northeast Louisiana Indians football team was an American football team that represented Northeast Louisiana University (now known as the University of Louisiana at Monroe) as an independent during the 1994 NCAA Division I-A football season. In their fifth year under head coach Ed Zaunbrecher, the team compiled a 3–8 record. The Indians offense scored 242 points while the defense allowed 384 points.

Schedule

References

Northeast Louisiana
Louisiana–Monroe Warhawks football seasons
Northeast Louisiana Indians football